Jack Humphreys  (13 January 1920 – 21 September 1954) was a Welsh international footballer who played as a defender for Everton. He was part of the Wales national football team, playing 1 match on 16  April 1947 against Ireland.

Playing career
In November 1936 it was reported he had signed Amateur forms for Bolton Wanderers having scored 37 goals in 5 games for Friars School in Bangor.

In 1945 he signed for Everton from Llandudno.

Death
Humphreys died in Caernarfon sanitorium in September 1954 at the age of 34.

See also
 List of Wales international footballers (alphabetical)

References

1920 births
1954 deaths
People from Llandudno
Sportspeople from Conwy County Borough
Welsh footballers
Wales international footballers
Everton F.C. players
Association football defenders